Michael Schindele (born 27 January 1994 in Ellwangen) is a German footballer who plays as a defender for Sportfreunde Dorfmerkingen.

References

External links
 
 Michael Schindele at FuPa

German footballers
1994 births
Living people
2. Bundesliga players
Regionalliga players
1. FC Kaiserslautern players
SSV Ulm 1846 players
Association football defenders
People from Ellwangen
Sportspeople from Stuttgart (region)
Footballers from Baden-Württemberg